Feuquerolles is a former railway station located in the commune of Feuquières-en-Vimeu in the Somme department, France.  The SNCF station was served by TER Hauts-de-France trains from Le Tréport-Mers to Abbeville. Train services were discontinued in 2018.

The station
Feuquerolles is an unmanned stop located at the 195.620 km point on the single-track Eu - Abbeville line, between Chépy-Valines and Feuquières-Fressenneville. The line opened on 4 December 1882. In 2008, the station was improved as part of a renewal of facilities on the entire line by the SNCF.

See also
List of SNCF stations in Hauts-de-France

References

Railway stations in France opened in 1882
Defunct railway stations in Somme (department)